Lusia or Lousia was a deme of ancient Attica, of the phyle Oeneïs, sending one delegate to the Athenian Boule. Stephanus of Byzantium notes it was named after a heroine named Lusia, a daughter of Hyacinthus the Lacedaemonian.

The deme is attested in inscriptions; one a funerary inscription of a townsperson, another describing the deme's contributions to construction of the Eleusinion.

The site of Lousia is in the Kephisos valley, west of modern Athens.

References

Populated places in ancient Attica
Former populated places in Greece
Demoi